Dean van der Sluys (born 29 August 1995) is a Dutch professional footballer who plays as a left-back. He plays for TOP Oss.

Club career
Van der Sluys made his professional debut in the Eerste Divisie for TOP Oss on 23 November 2014 in a game against Sparta Rotterdam.

In July 2019, he signed for RKC Waalwijk, who had recently been promoted to the Eredivisie. In the first half of the season he failed to make an appearance, and as a result he returned to TOP Oss in January 2020, where he signed for six months until June 2020.

On 9 July 2020, Van der Sluys signed for Eerste Divisie club Helmond Sport on a two-year contract. He made his league debut on 29 August 2020 in a 2–1 win over his former club TOP Oss away at Frans Heesen Stadion. Van der Sluys scored his first goal for Helmond Sport in an Eerste Divisie fixture against Excelsior on 28 March 2021, a 3–0 win.

On 23 July 2022, van der Sluys returned to TOP Oss on a two-year contract.

References

External links
 

1995 births
Sportspeople from Oss
Footballers from North Brabant
Living people
Dutch footballers
TOP Oss players
RKC Waalwijk players
Helmond Sport players
Eerste Divisie players
Association football fullbacks
21st-century Dutch people